Vangelis Mourikis is a Greek film actor. He has appeared in more than thirty films since 1982. He studied in Australia where he did his first works. In 1990s he returned to Greece and devoted himself to independent cinema. He has won seven awards both leading and supporting actor. He has collaborated with many directors of new Greek cinema including Thodoros Maragos, Yannis Economides, Nikos Grammatikos, Pantelis Voulgaris, Athina Rachel Tsangari, and Georgis Grigorakis.

Filmography

Awards

References

External links
 

Living people
Greek male film actors
Year of birth missing (living people)